"Kaguya" (styled in all caps) is a single by Japanese boy band News. It was released on January 7, 2015. It debuted at number one on the weekly Oricon Singles Chart, with 140,000 copies. It also reached number one on the Billboard Japan Hot 100.

References 

2015 singles
2015 songs
News (band) songs
Oricon Weekly number-one singles
Billboard Japan Hot 100 number-one singles